Arthur Edwin Reid (16 September 1882 – 6 January 1959) was an English professional golfer of Scottish descent.  He won the 1905 Swiss Open and the 1918 Philadelphia Open Championship (tied with Pat Doyle). Reid also competed in The Open Championship and the U.S. Open. In the 1909 Open Championship he finished in 47th place and was tied in 37th place in the 1919 U.S. Open.

Golf career
Reid worked at the North Shore Club in Blackpool, England. In September 1907 he accepted a position as the head professional at the Bristol and Clifton Club. Prior to his time at North Shore Club he had been engaged at Boston, Woodhall Spa, Gainsborough, Lucerne, Paris, and  Seaford Links Club in Seaford, England.

Reid won the 1905 Swiss Open. The Open was played on the Lucerne Course and was contested over 36 holes, four rounds of the 9-hole course. Reid was the local professional and completed the four rounds in 155 (38-39-37-41), winning by 13 strokes from Bernard Callaway. Reid won a gold medal and the £10 first prize.

Emigration to America
Sailing aboard the RMS Baltic, Reid and his wife left Liverpool on 16 February 1915 and arrived in New York City on 26 February 1915. Later in 1915 he took his first job at the Upper Montclair Country Club in New Jersey. In 1918 he won the Philadelphia Open Championship when he was the co-champion with Pat Doyle (a playoff was not held). By 1921 he was playing out of Ardsley Club, Ardsley-on-Hudson, New York. Reid was also the long-time professional at The Country Club of Farmington, near Hartford, Connecticut, having the best score in a July 1927 club tournament. In 1929, Reid was elected president of the Central Connecticut Professional Golfer's Organization.

Family
Reid and his wife, Rebecca Reid née Hencher, had three children. Reid's brother-in-law was the noted French golf professional Louis Tellier. Reid had a younger brother, Wilfrid, who was also a professional golfer.

Professional wins

PGA Tour wins
1918 Philadelphia Open Championship (tied with Pat Doyle)

Other wins
1905 Swiss Open

References

English male golfers
English emigrants to the United States
People from Bulwell
Sportspeople from Nottinghamshire
1882 births
1959 deaths